The 2014–15 Rhode Island Rams women's basketball team will represent the University of Rhode Island during the 2014–15 college basketball season. Daynia La-Force assumes the responsibility as head coach for her first season. The Rams were members of the Atlantic 10 Conference and play their home games at the Ryan Center. They finished the season 17–13, 8–8 in A-10 play to finish in a tie for sixth place. They advanced to the quarterfinals of the A-10 women's tournament where they lost to Duquesne.

2014–15 media
All Rams home games and most conference road games that aren't televised will be shown on the A-10 Digital Network.

Roster

Schedule

|-
!colspan=9 style="background:#002B7F; color:#75B2DD;"| Regular Season

|-
!colspan=9 style="background:#75B2DD; color:#002B7F;"| Atlantic 10 Tournament

Rankings
2014–15 NCAA Division I women's basketball rankings

See also
 2014–15 Rhode Island Rams men's basketball team

References

Rhode Island Rams women's basketball seasons
Rhode Island
Rhode
Rhode